Michael Edward Zordich (born October 12, 1963) is a former American football defensive back and is a defensive backs coach for the Central Michigan. He played college football at Penn State. He was drafted in the ninth round (235th overall) of the 1986 NFL Draft by the San Diego Chargers.

He played 12 seasons as a cornerback and safety in the National Football League (NFL) and has since become a coach, has also coached for Cardinal Mooney High School, the Philadelphia Eagles, Youngstown State, and Michigan.

College career
Zordich attended Chaney High School prior to enrolling at Penn State University. At Penn State, he was a four-year letterman and a starter at "hero". As a senior, in 1985, he was selected as an All-American by the Football Writers Association of America. He was also a team co-captain. He finished his career with 201 tackles and earned a B. S. in hotel, restaurant, and institutional management.

Professional career
Zordich was drafted by the San Diego Chargers in the ninth round (235 overall) of the 1986 NFL Draft. He was released by the Chargers at the end of 1986 pre-season. In April 1987, he was signed by the New York Jets. During final cuts, he was waived by the Jets. He was re-signed on September 15. In 1987, he appeared in 10 games, primarily on special teams. He recorded eight tackles, and one sack. In 1988, he appeared in 16 games. He recorded 10 tackles and one interception.

In February 1989, Zordich was declared an unconditional free agent by the Jets. In March, he was signed by the Phoenix Cardinals in 1989. In 1989, he appeared in 16 games (seven starts). He recorded 60 tackles, one sack, and one interceptions. In 1990, he appeared in 16 games. He recorded 27 tackles, one fumble recovery, and one interceptions. In 1991, he started all 16 games. He recorded, a career-high, 87 tackles, as well as three fumble recoveries, and one interception. In 1992, he started all 16 games. He recorded 61 tackles, and three interceptions. In 1993, his final season in Phoenix, he appeared in 16 games (nine starts). He recorded 54 tackles, two forced fumbles, and one interception.

In June 1994, Zordich signed with the Philadelphia Eagles, signing a two-year $800,000 contract, where he replaced Andre Waters who left Philadelphia to sign with the, then newly re-named, Arizona Cardinals. In 1994, Zordich started all 16 games. He recorded 51 tackles, one sack, two forced fumbles, three fumble recoveries, and a career-high four interceptions. In 1995, he started 15 games, missing one. He recorded 60 tackles, one sack, two forced fumbles as well as two fumble recoveries, and one interception. In 1996, he started all 16 games. He recorded 64 tackles, and four interceptions. In 1997, he started all 16 games. He recorded 51 tackles, a career-high two sacks, one fumble recovery, and one interceptions. In his final season, 1998, he started all 16 games. He recorded 55 tackles, one fumble recovery, and two interceptions. After the season, his contract expired and he wasn't re-signed. In 1999, he was replaced by Tim Hauck.

After appearing in his first career game in 1987 with the Jets, Zordich missed just one game in his career.

Career statistics

Coaching career
In 2003, Zordich became a defensive assistant at Cardinal Mooney High School, he coached there for six seasons. In 2009, he joined the Philadelphia Eagles as the team's defensive quality control coach, for two seasons. In 2011, he was named the Eagles' safeties coach. In 2014, he was named Youngstown State's safeties coach. After the season, in January 2015, he was hired by the University of Michigan. Zordich was fired from Michigan on January 13, 2021 after six seasons as the defensive backs coach.

Personal life
Zordich lives in Ann Arbor, Michigan with his wife Cynthia, a photographer,. His son Michael Jr. played running back for the Nittany Lions and later the Carolina Panthers, and another son, Alex, played quarterback for the University at Buffalo, he also has a daughter, Aiden.

References

External links
 
 Youngstown State Penguins bio

1963 births
Living people
American people of Croatian descent
Players of American football from Youngstown, Ohio
American football cornerbacks
American football safeties
Penn State Nittany Lions football players
San Diego Chargers players
New York Jets players
Phoenix Cardinals players
Philadelphia Eagles players
High school football coaches in Ohio
Philadelphia Eagles coaches
Youngstown State Penguins football coaches
Michigan Wolverines football coaches